Elizabeth 'Ellie' Halbauer (born July 10, 1997) is an American tennis player.

Halbauer has career-high WTA rankings of 260 in singles, achieved January 2017, and 263 in doubles, reached in June 2017.

She made her WTA Tour main-draw debut at the 2017 Charleston Open in the doubles draw, partnering Sofia Kenin.

ITF Circuit finals

Singles: 13 (6 titles, 7 runner–ups)

Doubles: 5 (1 title, 4 runner–ups)

References

External links
 
 

1997 births
Living people
American female tennis players
21st-century American women